Ma voie (My Way) is the debut studio album by Belgian singer of Italian origin, Roberto Bellarosa. It was released on the September 21, 2012. The album reached number 11 in Belgium. The album includes the singles "Jealous Guy", "Je Crois" and "Apprends-moi".

Singles
 "Jealous Guy" was the first single to be released from the album on April 4, 2012.
 "Je Crois" was the second single released from the album on July 6, 2012.
 "Apprends-moi" was the third single released from the album on October 26, 2012.

Track listing

Chart performance

Release history

References

2012 debut albums
Roberto Bellarosa albums